Nicola Kathryn Pollitt  has been the British Ambassador to Nepal since November 2019.  Pollitt is the first woman British Ambassador to Nepal in more than two hundred years.

She is one of seven female ambassadors to Nepal, out of a total of 27 resident ambassadors.

References

Ambassadors of the United Kingdom to Nepal
British women ambassadors
Year of birth missing (living people)
Living people